The English Cat (in German, Die englische Katze) is an opera in two acts by Hans Werner Henze to an English libretto by Edward Bond, based on  (The heartbreak of an English cat) by Honoré de Balzac. The opera was first performed in a German translation by the Stuttgart Opera at the Schlosstheater Schwetzingen at the Schwetzingen Festival on 2 June 1983. The French premiere was at the Opéra-Comique, Paris in 1984. The first performance using the original English text was at Santa Fe on 13 July 1985.  The UK premiere was at the Leith Theatre, Edinburgh, on 19 August 1987.   A revised version was performed at Montepulciano in 1990 and this was given in London in 1991.

Roles

Synopsis
The opera is set in London in the 1890s.

A group of bourgeois cats has formed the Royal Society for the Protection of Rats.  Avowed pacifists as well, the society has been raising a young orphan mouse, Louise.  There is a love triangle between Lord Puff, his wife Minette, and Tom.

Instrumentation
 Woodwind: 2 flutes, (both also treble recorders and piccolos), 2 oboes (both also English horn, 2nd doubling on Heckelphone), 2 clarinets (1st doubling on E flat clarinet, 2nd on bass clarinet and contrabass clarinet), 2 bassoons (2nd doubling on double bassoon)
 Brass: 2 horns, 1 trumpet, 1 trombone
 Percussion (3 players): 2 glass bars, 9 Chinese gongs, suspended cymbals, African wood drum, 8 log drums, tumba, maracas, claves, güiro, 2 sistrums, wood block, cabaça, 5 temple blocks, switches, American slat clacks, bass metallophone (or bass xylophone), 9 finger cymbals, slide whistle, 14 small bells
 harp, piano (also 4 hands), celesta, small organ, zither, strings (6.4.3.3.1)

Recording
 Wergo WER 62042: Richard Berkeley-Steele (Lord Puff), Mark Coles (Arnold), Louisa Kennedy (Minett), Gunvor Nilsson (Babette/Der Mond), Ian Platt (Tom); Parnassus Orchestra London; Markus Stenz, conductor

References
Notes

Sources
Clements, Andrew,  "The English Cat", The New Grove Dictionary of Opera, ed. Stanley Sadie (London, 1992) 
Petersen, Peter, "Klischee als Sujet. Hans Werner Henzes 'The English Cat' und sein Arbeitstagebuch, Ernst Kolleritsch, Hg., "Klischee und Wirklichkeit in der musikalischen Moderne", U. E., Wien, 1994, S. 62–91.

External links
The English Cat on the Schott Music website (English/German)
 Wergo English language page on CD set of The English Cat

Operas
English-language operas
Operas by Hans Werner Henze
1983 operas
Operas set in London
Operas set in England
Adaptations of works by Honoré de Balzac